Yasar Shah is an Indian politician and a member of the 16th and 17th Legislative Assembly of Uttar Pradesh. He represents the Matera constituency of Uttar Pradesh's Bahraich district and is a member of the Samajwadi Party. He was also Minister of State in Uttar Pradesh Government for Power, Coal and New and Renewable Energy, Minister Of State (IC) for Transport, and Minister for Commercial Taxes.

Birth and education
Yasar Shah was born on 22 May 1977, in Mohalla Qazipura city Bahraich of Uttar Pradesh. His father, Dr. Waqar Ahmad Shah, was a member of the 16th Legislative Assembly of Uttar Pradesh from 1993 to 11 March 2017 for the assembly constituency of Bahraich. His mother Rubab Sayda is a former member of the Lok Sabha for the Lok Sabha constituency of Bahraich.
Yasar Shah's primary education took place in the city of Bahraich. He was a student of the English School of Bahraich's Seventh-day Adventist Inter College. However, he studied Inter. After that he graduated from the famous Aligarh Muslim University and did an MBA from Babu Banarasi Das Institute Lucknow of Technical University, Lucknow (now Dr. A.P.J. Abdul Kalam Technical University) in 2002.

Political life
Yasar Shah started his political journey from election for the district Board of Bahraich in 2005, in which he had won the highest votes. 
In 2007, from the Nanpara assembly constituency of Bahraich he participated in election on ticket of Samajwadi Party but later he took back his nomination from election. 
 
Yasar Shah has won two elections from Matera constituency so far, the 2012 and 2017 elections, respectively.

In the 2012 Assembly elections Yasar Shah received 41944 votes and defeated Ali Akbar (INC) who received 39143 votes.

Whereas in 2017 Assembly Elections Yasar Shah got 79188 votes and defeated Arun Veer Singh (BJP) who got 77593 votes.
In 2013, his father, Dr. Waqar Ahmad Shah became the Minister of Labor and Employment in Akhilesh Yadav's cabinet of Uttar Pradesh Government. In 2014, Yasar Shah joined Chief Minister Akhilesh Yadav in his ministry and assumed the post of Minister of state for Power.
While working on this post, he has constructed several power houses in the Bahraich City and district Bahraich to improve power supply in the district and city Bahraich. In Bahraich city the underground supply of electricity started, which cost 100 crores. After Mumbai and Delhi, Bahraich is third city where there is underground supply of electricity. Apart from this, there was construction of medical college and trauma center in Bahraich city. Yasar Shah became minister in Akhilesh Yadav's cabinet as Minister of state for Power.
Later on he was promoted and made MoS (Independent charge) for Transport.
In the final cabinet expansion in 2016 he was again promoted and was made Cabinet Minister for Commercial Taxes and Registration.

Positions held 
 2005: elected Member of District Board Bahraich 
 2012: elected as Member Assembly 16th from Matera constituency of Bahraich from ticket of Samajwadi Party
 March 2014 to October 2015: Minister Of state for Power Department Uttar Pradesh government
 November 2015 to September 2016: the State Minister (Independent Charges) for Transport in Uttar Pradesh government
 September 2016 to 11 March 2017: the Cabinet Minister for Sales Tax and Regulations in Uttar Pradesh government
 11 March 2017: re-elected as Member Assembly 17th from Matera constituency of Bahraich from ticket of Samajwadi Party

Yasar Shah is the son of former Cabinet Minister Dr. Waqar Ahmad Shah.

See also

 Uttar Pradesh Legislative Assembly
Waqar Ahmad Shah
Rubab Sayda
Akhilesh Yadav
Samajwadi Party

External links
http://www.livehindustan.com/uttar-pradesh/lucknow/story-sp-mla-return-by-police-1184938.html

References 

Living people
Samajwadi Party politicians
Uttar Pradesh MLAs 2012–2017
Uttar Pradesh MLAs 2017–2022
People from Bahraich
1978 births